Victoria E. Howle is an American applied mathematician specializing in numerical linear algebra and known as one of the developers of the Trilinos open-source software library for scientific computing. She is an associate professor in the Department of Mathematics and Statistics at
Texas Tech University.

Education and career
Howle graduated from Rutgers University in 1988 with a bachelor's degree in English literature. She earned her Ph.D. in 2001 from Cornell University. Her dissertation, Efficient Iterative Methods for Ill-Conditioned Linear and Nonlinear Network Problems, was supervised by Stephen Vavasis.

After working as a researcher at Sandia National Laboratories from 2000 to 2007, she took a faculty position at Texas Tech in 2007.

Service and recognition
Howle was one of the inaugural winners of the AWM Service Award of the Association for Women in Mathematics, in 2013. The award honored her service to the association, including founding its annual essay contest in which students write biographies of women mathematicians.

References

External links
Home page

Year of birth missing (living people)
Living people
21st-century American mathematicians
American women mathematicians
Applied mathematicians
Rutgers University alumni
Cornell University alumni
Sandia National Laboratories people
Texas Tech University faculty
21st-century American women